Leavenworth County (county code LV) is located in the U.S. state of Kansas and is part of the Kansas City metropolitan area. As of the 2020 census, the county population was 81,881. Its county seat and most populous city is Leavenworth.

History

Early history

For many millennia, the Great Plains of North America was inhabited by nomadic Native Americans.  From the 16th century to 18th century, the Kingdom of France claimed ownership of large parts of North America.  In 1762, after the French and Indian War, France secretly ceded New France to Spain, per the Treaty of Fontainebleau.

19th century
In 1802, Spain returned most of the land to France, but keeping title to about 7,500 square miles.  In 1803, most of the land for modern day Kansas was acquired by the United States from France as part of the 828,000 square mile Louisiana Purchase for 2.83 cents per acre.

In 1854, the Kansas Territory was organized, then in 1861 Kansas became the 34th U.S. state.  In 1855, Leavenworth County was established, and is among the first 33 counties, which were formed by the first territorial government.  It was named, as was its county seat, after Henry Leavenworth, an officer in the War of 1812.

Leavenworth County had the first Kansas State University extension agent in the State.

Geography
It is the fifth-smallest county in Kansas by total area.

This county's watershed connects with both the Kansas River basin on the south via Stranger Creek and has a Missouri River port city to the east.

Adjacent counties
 Platte County, Missouri (north)
 Wyandotte County (east)
 Johnson County (southeast)
 Douglas County (southwest)
 Jefferson County (west)
 Atchison County (northwest)

Demographics

The county is a part of the Kansas City, MO-KS Metropolitan Statistical Area.

As of the census of 2000, there were 68,691 people, 23,071 households, and 17,210 families residing in the county.  The population density was 148 people per square mile (57/km2).  There were 24,401 housing units at an average density of 53 per square mile (20/km2).  The racial makeup of the county was 84.2% White, 10.4% Black or African American, 0.7% Native American, 1.1% Asian, 0.1% Pacific Islander, 1.2% from other races, and 2.2% from two or more races. Hispanic or Latino of any race were 3.8% of the population.

There were 23,071 households, out of which 38.9% had children under the age of 18 living with them, 61.4% were married couples living together, 9.5% had a female householder with no husband present, and 25.4% were non-families. 21.7% of all households were made up of individuals, and 8.1% had someone living alone who was 65 years of age or older.  The average household size was 2.69 and the average family size was 3.15.

In the county, the population was spread out, with 26.7% under the age of 18, 8.2% from 18 to 24, 33.0% from 25 to 44, 22.2% from 45 to 64, and 9.8% who were 65 years of age or older.  The median age was 36 years. For every 100 females there were 113.50 males.  For every 100 females age 18 and over, there were 116.90 males.

The median income for a household in the county was $48,114, and the median income for a family was $55,805. Males had a median income of $40,047 versus $26,029 for females. The per capita income for the county was $20,292.  About 4.8% of families and 6.7% of the population were below the poverty line, including 8.8% of those under age 18 and 7.5% of those age 65 or over.

Government

Presidential elections

Laws
Leavenworth County was a prohibition, or "dry", county until the Kansas Constitution was amended in 1986 and voters approved the sale of alcoholic liquor by the individual drink with a 30 percent food sales requirement.

The county voted "No" on the 2022 Kansas Value Them Both Amendment, an anti-abortion ballot measure, by 59% to 41% despite backing Donald Trump with 59% of the vote to Joe Biden's 38% in the 2020 presidential election.

Education

Colleges and universities
 United States Army Command and General Staff College
 University of Saint Mary
 Leavenworth Normal School (closed)

Unified school districts
School districts include:
 Basehor–Linwood USD 458 
 Bonner Springs USD 204
 Easton USD 449 
 Fort Leavenworth USD 207
 Jefferson County North USD 339
 Kansas City USD
 Lansing USD 469
 Lawrence USD 497
 Leavenworth USD 453
 McLouth USD 342
 Tonganoxie USD 464

Communities

Cities

 Basehor
 Bonner Springs (part)
 De Soto  (part)
 Easton
 Kansas City  (part)
 Lansing
 Leavenworth
 Linwood
 Tonganoxie

Unincorporated communities

 Coldspur
 Fairmount
 Fall Leaf
 Hoge
 Jarbalo
 Kickapoo
 Lowemont
 Maltby
 Millwood
 Reno
 Springdale
 Wadsworth
 Bonner-Loring, also lies within Wyandotte County (Bonner Springs).

Townships
Leavenworth County is divided into ten townships.  The cities of Lansing and Leavenworth are considered governmentally independent and are excluded from the census figures for the townships.  In the following table, the population center is the largest city (or cities) included in that township's population total, if it is of a significant size.

Notable people

 Sean Malto, professional skateboarder
 Wayne Simien, professional basketball player

See also
 National Register of Historic Places listings in Leavenworth County, Kansas
 Lenape & Christian Munsee
 Ernest Fox Nichols - Educator & MIT physicist
 Fort Leavenworth (Frontier Army Museum)
 Freedom's Frontier, NE Kansas National Heritage Area
 Kansas Sampler, shares insights on community character

References

Further reading

 History of Leavenworth County Kansas; Jesse Hall and LeRoy Hand; Historical Publishing; 684 pages; 1921.
 Standard Atlas of Leavenworth County, Kansas; Geo. A. Ogle & Co; 42 pages; 1903.
 Atlas Map of Leavenworth County, Kansas; Missouri Publishing Co; 38 pages; 1878.

External links

County
 
 Leavenworth County - Directory of Public Officials
Maps
 Leavenworth County Maps: Current, Historic, KDOT
 Kansas Highway Maps: Current, Historic, KDOT
 Kansas Railroad Maps: Current, 1996, 1915, KDOT and Kansas Historical Society

 
Kansas counties
1855 establishments in Kansas Territory
Kansas counties on the Missouri River